US Post Office-Penn Yan is a historic post office building located at Penn Yan in Yates County, New York.  It was designed and built in 1912–1913 and is one of a number of post offices in New York State designed by the Office of the Supervising Architect of the Treasury Department, James Knox Taylor. It is a symmetrically massed, -story red brick structure on a granite-clad raised basement in the Colonial Revival style. It is a contributing element in the Penn Yan Historic District.

It was listed on the National Register of Historic Places in 1989.

References

Penn Yan
Colonial Revival architecture in New York (state)
Government buildings completed in 1913
Buildings and structures in Yates County, New York
1913 establishments in New York (state)
National Register of Historic Places in Yates County, New York